Final Fantasy is a series of role-playing video games developed and published by Square Enix (formerly Square). Its first game premiered in Japan in 1987, and Final Fantasy games have subsequently been localized for markets in North America, Europe and Australia, on nearly every video game console since its debut on the Nintendo Entertainment System. Final Fantasy is Square Enix's most successful franchise, having sold over 97 million units worldwide to date. In addition to traditional role-playing games, the series includes tactical role-playing games, portable games, massively multiplayer online role-playing games, and games for mobile phones. Its popularity has placed it as the sixth-best-selling video game franchise, and the series has won multiple awards over the years.

In addition to the 15 games released as part of the main (numbered) series and their many spin-offs and related titles, the Final Fantasy series has spawned many works in other media including anime, movies, novels and manga, and radio dramas. Final Fantasy: Unlimited, originally a stand-alone anime series, now has its own sub-franchise which includes video games. Many games, particularly the main series, have soundtrack album releases featuring their music in different arrangements. Square Enix has also consistently released companion books for its games which provide additional backstory and plot information, as well as detailed walkthroughs for the game. Since the announcement of Compilation of Final Fantasy VII, Square Enix has focused on "polymorphic content", expanding each game world with material on many video game platforms, as well as other forms of media.

Video games

Each game in the main series takes place in a different fictional universe, although beginning with Final Fantasy X-2, additional video games set in the main series games' worlds have been released. Compilation of Final Fantasy VII and Fabula Nova Crystallis Final Fantasy are cross-platform multimedia projects consisting of games, films, books, and other media centered on their respective main series game, Final Fantasy VII and Final Fantasy XIII. Final Fantasy Tactics, although originally envisioned as a spin-off game, became its own series as part of Ivalice Alliance, which counts Final Fantasy XII in its membership.

A large number of spin-off video games have also been made for the Final Fantasy series. These spin-off games vary in their relation to the main series; the first, The Final Fantasy Legend games, were marketed as related in North America but were considered to be the first three games of the SaGa series in their native Japan, and later SaGa games released outside Japan bear no Final Fantasy branding. Dissidia Final Fantasy, on the other hand, is a fighting game using characters from the main series exclusively. Overall, more than 30 games have been released as spin-offs of the main Final Fantasy series, many within their own sub-series.

Film and television
Square's initial forays into film and television were critical and commercial failures. Final Fantasy: Legend of the Crystals was poorly received and the box office failure of Final Fantasy: The Spirits Within lead to the merger between Square and Enix. The series did not have success in film until Final Fantasy VII: Advent Children, which ultimately won several awards for "best anime feature" and sold over 2.4 million copies within a year.

Radio drama
Despite its decline in the United States, radio drama has remained popular in Japan. The series features a small number of radio drama releases.

Soundtracks

The primary composer of music for the main series was Nobuo Uematsu, who single-handedly composed the soundtracks for the first nine games, as well as directed the production of many of the albums. Music for the spin-off series and main series games beginning with Final Fantasy X was created by a variety of composers including Masashi Hamauzu, Naoshi Mizuta, Hitoshi Sakimoto, and Kumi Tanioka, as well as many others. In addition to the original soundtracks, listed below, many games have inspired orchestral, vocal, or piano arrangement albums, as well as compilation albums featuring music from several Final Fantasy games.

Companion books

Starting with Final Fantasy III, Square began publishing guide books for its games which traditionally include additional content such as developer interviews and expanded plot and setting information. Studio BentStuff wrote the first Ultimania book for Final Fantasy VIII in 1999, though the company had been contracted to write Final Fantasy VII True Script Dissection for the previous game. Since then, Ultimania books have been written for every major Final Fantasy title, including Battle Ultimania, Scenario Ultimania, and Ultimania Omega editions for some games. Square experimented with online content delivery with Final Fantasy IX Online Ultimania, but the move was criticized for forcing customers to buy a print guide while releasing most of the information online. Another online Ultimania was planned for Final Fantasy XI, but was dropped during development. Square Enix has produced expanded editions to some books, such as Final Fantasy VII 10th Anniversary Ultimania Revised Edition. In addition to the Ultimania series, Square Enix also publishes an Official Complete Guide series of guide books.

A set of three artbooks have also been produced under the title The Sky: The Art of Final Fantasy. The set was first released in Japan in May 2002 by Digicube, then released in North America as a boxed set a decade later on October 17, 2012 by Dark Horse Books with additional postcards, prints, and booklets. A third edition was released in a slipcase by Dark Horse Books on July 17, 2013 without the additional pieces. Each book features concept art by Yoshitaka Amano, with the first book covering Final Fantasy I through III, the second IV through VI, and the third VII through X.

Novels and manga
Many Final Fantasy games have been adapted as novels and manga series. With the advent of the Internet, web novels and digital publishing have also become common. These stories act as companion pieces, offering an interpretation of the game's events or expanding the plot of the games by depicting additional scenarios.

See also
 List of Kingdom Hearts media

References

Final Fantasy
Final Fantasy
Final Fantasy